"Tomorrow and tomorrow and tomorrow" is the beginning of the second sentence of one of the most famous soliloquies in William Shakespeare's tragedy Macbeth. It takes place in the beginning of the fifth scene of Act 5, during the time when the Scottish troops, led by Malcolm and Macduff, are approaching Macbeth's castle to besiege it. Macbeth, the play's protagonist, is confident that he can withstand any siege from Malcolm's forces. He hears the cry of a woman and reflects that there was a time when his hair would have stood on end if he had heard such a cry, but he is now so full of horrors and slaughterous thoughts that it can no longer startle him.

Seyton then tells Macbeth of Lady Macbeth's death, and Macbeth delivers this soliloquy as his response to the news. Shortly afterwards, he is told of the apparent movement of Birnam Wood towards Dunsinane Castle (as the witches had prophesied to him), which is actually Malcolm's forces having disguised themselves with tree branches so as to hide their numbers as they approach the castle. This sets the scene for the final events of the play and Macbeth's death at the hands of Macduff.

Titular reuses

To-morrow, and to-morrow, and to-morrow...

 "Tomorrow and Tomorrow and so Forth" is a 1955 short story by John Updike.
 "Tomorrow and Tomorrow and Tomorrow" is a 1953 short story by Kurt Vonnegut.
 "Tomorrow, and Tomorrow, and Tomorrow" is the title of an episode (S02 E13, 2019-04-18) of season two of The Orville.
 Tomorrow and Tomorrow by Charles Sheffield is a 1997 science fiction novel, where a man searches endlessly to reverse the fate "She should have died hereafter..."
 One of the main musical themes of Final Fantasy XIV: Shadowbringers is titled "Tomorrow and Tomorrow".
 Tomorrow, and Tomorrow, and Tomorrow is a 2022 novel by Gabrielle Zevin.

... and all our yesterdays have lighted fools the way to dusty death

 All Our Yesterdays is used as the title of several works, encompassing literature, music and television, including a 1969 history of 1940s science fiction fandom by Harry Warner, Jr, an episode of Star Trek: The Original Series (Season 3, Episode 24, 1969); and a 1994 novel by Robert B. Parker.
Tutti i nostri ieri ('All Our Yesterdays') or A Light for Fools (American title) is a novel by Natalia Ginzburg.
All Our Yesterdays was a British television programme from 1960 to 1973 and from 1987 to 1989.
All My Yesterdays is a 1966 album by the Thad Jones/Mel Lewis Orchestra.
 All My Yesterdays: An Autobiography by actor Edward G. Robinson.
 All My Yesterdays by Cecil Arthur Lewis
 The Way to Dusty Death is a 1973 novel by Alistair MacLean.
Dusty Death, a 1931 novel of drug smuggling by Clifton Robbins.

Out, out, brief candle!
 "Out, Out—" is a 1916 poem by Robert Frost.
 Brief Candles is the title of a collection of short stories by the author Aldous Huxley.
Life is but a walking shadow, a poor player that struts and frets his hour upon the stage.
 Walking Shadow, published in 1994, is the 21st Spenser novel by Robert B. Parker.
 Struts & Frets is a 2009 novel by Jon Skovron

And then is heard no more.
 And Then Is Heard No More is a song from Mili.

It is a tale told by an idiot, full of sound and fury, signifying nothing.
 Four Tales Told by an Idiot is a 1979 collection of poems by Ted Hughes.
 The Sound and the Fury is a novel by William Faulkner.
 Sound and Fury is a 2000 documentary about deaf children.
 "Sound & Fury" was the name of Edward Vesala's ensemble.
 "Signifying Nothing" is the title of a short story in the 1999 collection Brief Interviews with Hideous Men, by David Foster Wallace.

Other reuses
 Kevin Costner's unnamed character from The Postman recites this while he is putting on a one-man performance of Macbeth at the village in the opening act in exchange for food and supplies. He is continuously corrected by one of the villagers when he misquotes several lines, seemingly intentional in spite of the corrections. 
 Minister Zhang from Mr. Robot quotes the speech in an episode titled "Logic Bomb".
 In the movie Birdman by Alejandro González Iñárritu, the entire monologue is recited by a jobless actor in the street.
 In the video game Saints Row IV, the main antagonist Zinyak recites the soliloquy in its entirety, save for the first sentence.
 The mis-quote "creeps on this petty pace" is used by the Sopranos character Johnny Sack in the season four finale when complaining to Tony Soprano over Johnny's working relationship with his boss.
 In Doctor Who and the Revenge of the Cybermen (episode 4) the Doctor, having destroyed a cyberman using a cybermat, declaims before the body: "...dusty death. Out, out..." – he is heard no more as Sarah Jane Smith hurries him from the room.
 In the Cosby Show episode, Theo and Cockroach, after Cliff and Clair discover Theo and Cockroach studying for a Macbeth test using only "Cleland Notes" and subtly remind them of the folly of relying only on Cleland Notes to prepare for any test or lesson, Clair leaves them alone, reciting the "tomorrow and tomorrow and tomorrow" line as she walks out, which causes them to stop and become a little uneasy. Theo wonders out loud if the passage was from Macbeth and Cockroach assures him it couldn't be because it wasn't in the Cleland Notes. (Actually, the Cliffs Notes version of Macbeth does mention the passage.)
 Marilyn Manson recites part of the soliloquy in the song "Overneath the Path of Misery" and in the short film Born Villain (2011).
 Hamilton uses the third and fourth lines of the section in the song "Take a Break".
 In the video game Death Stranding, the player can unlock a journal written by the main antagonist Higgs Monaghan lamenting his defeat, which paraphrases the end of the monologue.
 The Star Trek: The Next Generation episode "Hide and Q" (S01 E10, 1987-11-23) uses this quote.
 ESPN SportsCenter anchor Stuart Scott frequently used the last two lines as a catch phrase to describe sports highlights.
 In the Venture Bros. episode "Tag Sale -- You're It!" the villain The Monarch references the last two lines after a visit to a porta-potty.
 The 2021 Indian Bengali language crime thriller web series Mandaar is a loose adaptation of Shakespeare's Macbeth in which the lead protagonist utters a modified version of the soliloquy in the last episode of the series.
 In his opening speech to the Parliament of Malaysia dated 20 December 2022, the 10th Prime Minister of Malaysia, Dato' Seri Anwar Ibrahim quoted the last two line of the soliloquy in response to the slanderous opening remarks by the Leader of the Opposition, Hamzah Zainudin, on previous day.

References

Monologues
Shakespearean phrases
Macbeth
Quotations from literature